4 Your Eyez Only World Tour was a concert tour by American recording artist J. Cole, to support his fourth studio album 4 Your Eyez Only (2016). Dreamville artists J.I.D, Ari Lennox and Lute served as opening acts on the first leg of the tour. Rappers  and Bas served as opening acts on the second leg of the tour, along with J.I.D and Ari Lennox. Dreamville artists J.I.D., Ari Lennox and EarthGang served as opening acts on the European leg of the tour.

Background
To further promote his fourth studio album, 4 Your Eyez Only, Cole announced 4 Your Eyez Only World Tour on February 21, 2017. The tour was to include 62 dates across North America, Europe and Australia. The first 13 dates took place in smaller, intimate venues, while the remaining set of dates will take place in arenas. The tour began on June 1, 2017 in Columbia, South Carolina and concluded on December 9, 2017 in  Perth, Australia.

A limited-edition 4 Your Eyez Only collectors' set was made available for pre-order on February 22, 2017 via Dreamville's website, with a shipping and release date of April 28, 2017. The bundle included 4 Your Eyez Only on vinyl, cassette and CD, or each could be purchased individually. The set also included limited artwork and 4 Your Eyez Only tour pre-sale access.

Opening acts
 J.I.D 
 Ari Lennox 
 Lute 
  
 Bas 
 Cozz 
 EarthGang

Set list 

 "For Whom the Bell Tolls"
 "Immortal"
 "Deja Vu"
 "Ville Mentality"
 "Change" 
 "Lights Please"
 "Nobody's Perfect" 
 "Can't Get Enough"
 "Forbidden Fruit"
 "Neighbors"
 "Foldin Clothes"
 "She's Mine, Pt. 2"
 "Love Yourz"
 "Wet Dreamz"
 "A Tale of 2 Citiez"
 "G.O.M.D."
 "Power Trip"
 "No Role Modelz"
 "4 Your Eyez Only"

Tour dates

Cancellations and rescheduled shows

References

2017 concert tours
J. Cole